Chronological snobbery is an argument that the thinking, art, or science of an earlier time is inherently inferior to that of the present, simply by virtue of its temporal priority or the belief that since civilization has advanced in certain areas, people of earlier periods were less intelligent. The term was coined by C. S. Lewis and Owen Barfield, and first mentioned by Lewis in his 1955 autobiographical work, Surprised by Joy. Chronological snobbery is a form of appeal to novelty.

Explanation
As Barfield explains it, it is the belief that "intellectually, humanity languished for countless generations in the most childish errors on all sorts of crucial subjects, until it was redeemed by some simple scientific dictum of the last century." The subject came up between them when Barfield had converted to Anthroposophy and was seeking to get Lewis (an atheist at the time) to join him. One of Lewis's objections was that religion was simply outdated, and in Surprised by Joy (chapter 13, pp. 207–208), he describes how this was fallacious:

A manifestation of chronological snobbery is the usage in general of the word "medieval" to mean "backwards".

See also
Declinism
Genetic fallacy
Historian's fallacy
Myth of progress
Presentism (literary and historical analysis)
Whig history

References

External links
Chronological Snobbery at Encyclopedia Barfieldiana
C. S. Lewis on Chronological Snobbery
Chronological Snobbery at Summa Bergania

1950s neologisms
C. S. Lewis
Relevance fallacies